Thomas Boulsover (1705 – 9 September 1788), was a Sheffield cutler who is best remembered as the inventor of Sheffield Plate. He made his fortune manufacturing various items, but especially buttons using the process, he later diversified into making cast steel and saws.

Early years and apprenticeship

Boulsover was born in Longley, which was then a remote hamlet between the town of Sheffield and the village of Ecclesfield, He was the son of Samuel Boulsover, a farmer and cutler and Margaret Brownell of Hathersage, being baptised at Ecclesfield church on 18 October 1705. He began his apprenticeship to learn the trade of cutler in 1718, being apprenticed to Joseph Fletcher, a native of Wirksworth in Derbyshire who had established himself as a cutler in Sheffield. Fletcher was a Presbyterian and the young Boulsover would have been brought up with the same religious views as it was expected that an apprentice would join his master and family in their manner of worship. Thomas Boulsover's apprenticeship was completed in 1726 and he was granted the freedom of the Company of Cutlers in Hallamshire on 26 November of that year, the act being recorded in the Freedoms Book at the Cutlers' Hall. As was traditional Boulsover was also awarded his own trademark and this was registered in the Mark Book.

Cutler
Boulsover chose to practice as a free cutler in the developing township of Sheffield and on 28 October 1728 he married Hannah Dodworth of Owlerton at Sheffield parish church, they set up home in the Norfolk Street area where groups of cutlers were settling in newly built properties. The Boulsovers' first child Sarah was born in June 1729 but the infant soon died; the Boulsovers had ten children throughout their marriage of which only two survived to adulthood. Thomas Boulsover continued as a cutler, with several apprentices working for him over the years; in the early 1740s he moved his business to new premises on Sycamore Hill (now Tudor Street) the workshop being on the corner of Tudor Street and Surrey Street opposite the present day Sheffield Central Library.

Sheffield plate

In early 1743 Boulsover made the accidental discovery which was to change his life and have an immense effect on the success and development of Sheffield. While repairing the decorative handle of a knife made from copper and silver he accidentally slightly overheated the handle causing the two metals to fuse. Boulsover's initial despair at ruining a customer's expensive knife soon turned to elation when he realised the significance and potential of his find. Boulsover experimented with his discovery of Sheffield Plate and found that when the silver and copper were fused together they could be treated as one metal, meaning that an ingot of copper fused with a layer of silver could be rolled to any area and thickness and still retain the same proportion of the two metals. This satisfied Boulsover that the fused metal could be modelled into any article and could be used on a commercial scale.

Thomas Boulsover needed financial assistance to set up a business in fused plate and it came from Mr Strelley Pegge of Beauchief Hall who loaned him the necessary capital. He went into partnership with Joseph Wilson whose father was a scythe smith at Sharrow, setting up a workshop on Baker's Hill in Sheffield. The main product of the business was to make buttons from fused plate which would sell for only a fraction of the price of solid silver buttons. Boulsover's buttons were stamped from a die on a fused metal sheet, then cut out, polished and burnished until they were hardly distinguishable from genuine silver. The business also made buckles, spurs and small snuff boxes. Joseph Wilson left the partnership in the mid 1740s, setting up his own business at Sharrow Mills making Sheffield plate items before diversifying into manufacturing snuff for which the Wilsons became World-famous. In 1749 Boulsover rented a lease of land in Beeley Wood to build a grinding wheel, but an alteration to the original lease allowed it to be converted into a tilt forge known as the Nova Scotia Tilts.

Thomas Boulsover repaid the money loaned from Strelley Pegge and continued his enterprise with the help of two apprentices, also hiring John Hoyland as an agent to promote the sale of his buttons. Unfortunately Boulsover did not take out a patent on his discovery of Sheffield plate and Hoyland set up a business of his own making buttons and passed the secrets of the process on to others. Despite this competition, Boulsover's button business thrived. In 1751 Thomas was elected as one of the 24 assistants to the Master Cutler, however even though he was re-elected as an assistant the following year he never rose any higher in the Company of Cutlers. In 1757 he moved his business to larger premises on Norfolk Street (now the location of the Crucible Theatre stage door), in the same year he bought Whiteley Wood Hall from his initial patron Strelley Pegge. Now a member of the gentry, Boulsover's guidance as a leading townsman was eagerly sought; he became involved in discussions on the Sheffield to Leeds turnpike road and became one of the original trustees.

Later life
In 1760 Boulsover turned his interest to manufacturing better quality steel. He purchased land from the Duke of Norfolk on the Porter Brook just below Whiteley Wood Hall and commenced rolling steel. He discovered that cast steel gave a much better edge to saws and concentrated on saw making, with his product being far superior to those made by the old method of hammering. In 1774 Boulsover & Co., based at Whiteley Woods and Norfolk Street, was described as “makers of saws, fenders, edge tools, cast steel and emory”. However button production continued at a site further up the Porter at Forge Dam, Fulwood.

In 1772 Hannah Boulsover, Thomas's wife died and was buried in the churchyard of St Paul's Church on 9 July. The couple had been married for almost 44 years. As Thomas Boulsover grew older, he was helped by Anthony Thompson whom he had taken into partnership and who eventually took over the management of the rolling mills and saw manufacture. Thomas Boulsover died at Whiteley Wood Hall on Tuesday 9 September 1788 and was buried on 13 September at St Paul's church alongside Hannah. Early in 1789, Boulsover's two surviving children Mary Mitchell and Sarah Hutton built a small Methodist chapel near to Whiteley Wood Hall in memory of their father. The chapel still stands today although it is now an outbuilding of Meadow Farm. It has an plaque which reads “This chapel was built by Mary Mitchell and Sarah Hutton in 1789 in memory of their father Thomas Boulsover the inventor of Sheffield Plate (1705 - 1788).

References

People from Ecclesfield
English inventors
History of Sheffield
1705 births
1788 deaths
British industrialists
Businesspeople from Sheffield